The South American Championship 1957 was a football tournament held in Peru and won by Argentina with Brazil as runners-up. Bolivia, and Paraguay withdrew from the tournament.

Humberto Maschio from Argentina and Javier Ambrois from Uruguay became top scorers of the tournament with 9 goals each.

Summary 
Managed by Guillermo Stábile, Argentina won the tournament with a team widely considered one of the best squads in its history, and the first "legendary team" of Argentina since its inception in 1901. The attacking line (nicknamed Carasucias) was composed of Omar Corbatta, Humberto Maschio, Antonio Angelillo, Enrique Sívori and Osvaldo Cruz. Beyond its virtues and high goalscoring (25 goals in 6 matches), Argentina was a well-balanced team with a strong defense with Pedro Dellacha and Néstor Rossi as two of its most notable players that helped the team to finish the competition with the fewest goals conceded.

Despite Argentina having won other South American competitions before, the 1957 Sudamericano was the first Argentine achievement with a great repercussion on the media. Likewise, Sívori was chosen as the best player of the tournament.

Because of their great performances, Maschio, Angelillo and Sívori would be traded to Italian clubs (Bologna, Internazionale and Juventus respectively) after the tournament, losing the chance to play the FIFA World Cup held in Sweden one year later, due to the AFA interventor, Raúl Colombo, not calling them for the national team considering that "we are plenty of players here".

Squads 

For a complete list of participating squads see: 1957 South American Championship squads

Venues

Final round 

Match suspended at the 43rd minute due to pitch invasion.

Result

Goalscorers 

A total of 33 different players scored 101 goals in the tournament. None were credited as own goals.

9 Goals
  Humberto Maschio
  Javier Ambrois

8 Goals

  Antonio Angelillo
  Didi
  Evaristo

5 Goals
  Alberto Terry

4 Goals
  Jorge Larraz

3 Goals

  Omar Sívori
  Pepe
  José Fernández
  Jaime Ramírez Banda
  Carlos Arango
  Delio Gamboa
  Enrique Cantos
  Máximo Mosquera
  Luis Campero

2 Goals

  Oreste Corbatta
  Osvaldo Cruz
  Joel
  Zizinho
  Carlos Verdejo
  Manuel Rivera

1 Goal

  José Sanfilippo
  Sergio Espinosa
  Alejandro Carrillo
  Humberto Álvarez
  Jaime Gutiérrez
  Alberto Valencia
  Juan Bassa
  Juan Seminario
  Carlos María Carranza
  José Walter Roque
  José Sasía

References 

 
1957
International association football competitions hosted by Peru
Sports competitions in Lima
1957 in South American football
March 1957 sports events in South America
April 1957 sports events in South America
1950s in Lima